Spearsville is an unincorporated community in Hamblen Township, Brown County, in the U.S. state of Indiana.

History
Spearsville was founded in about 1835. It was named for its founder, William Spears. A post office was established at Spearsville in 1855, and remained in operation until it was discontinued in 1907.

Geography

References

Unincorporated communities in Brown County, Indiana
Unincorporated communities in Indiana
1830s establishments in Indiana
Populated places established in the 1830s